Karakol Nature Park is a national park in Ak-Suu District of Issyk-Kul Region of Kyrgyzstan established in April 1997. The purpose of the park is conservation of the unique nature complexes, forests, and flora and fauna of special ecological and aesthetic value for beneficial combination of natural and cultural landscapes and their use for recreational, cultural and educational purposes. The park is located 6 km from the regional center Karakol and 336 km from Bishkek.

The nature park is situated on the north side of the Teskey Alatoo range, in the eastern part of the Issyk-Kul valley. It features the Karakol Gorge, formed by the river Karakol, and the pretty alpine lake Ala Köl.

References

Protected areas established in 1997
National parks of Kyrgyzstan